The International Racquetball Federation's 19th Racquetball World Championships are being held in San José, Costa Rica from August 10–18. This is the first time Worlds have been Costa Rica, and the first time a Central American country has hosted the event.

In 2016, Mexicans Alvaro Beltran and Javier Moreno won the men's doubles World Championship for the third time as a team, when the defeated Americans Jake Bredenbeck and Jose Diaz in the final, 15-12, 15-9. Previously, the Mexicans had won in 2006 and 2012. Moreno also won the title in 2000 with Luis Bustilos. The Mexicans defeated the 2012 World Champions, Sebastian Franco and Alejandro Herrera of Colombia, in the semi-finals.

Tournament format
The 2018 World Championships used a two stage format with an initial group stage that was a round robin with the results used to seed players for a medal round.

Group stage

Pool A

Pool B

Note - Costa Rica defeated Colombia by injury forfeit after Colombia had won game one.

Pool C

Pool D

Medal round

References

2018 Racquetball World Championships